Thaddäus-Monju Momuluh (born 18 February 2002) is a German professional footballer who plays for  club Hannover 96 as a forward.

Career

Momuluh started his career with Hannover 96 after playing for their youth and reserve teams. He made his professional debut for Hannover 96 in the 2. Bundesliga on 11 February 2023, against SC Paderborn, coming on as a substitute for Jannik Dehm in the 58th minute; the match eventually ended in a 3–4 home loss for his side.

References

External links
 
 
 
 
 

2002 births
Living people
German footballers
Association football forwards
Hannover 96 II players
Hannover 96 players
2. Bundesliga players
Regionalliga players